Đông Triều  is a district-level town of Quảng Ninh Province in the north-eastern region of Vietnam. As of 2015 the district had a population of 173,141. The district covers an area of 397.2155 km². The  town capital lies at Đông Triều ward.

Administrative divisions
The town consists of the 10 wards of:
 Đông Triều 
 Mạo Khê
 Xuân Sơn
 Hưng Đạo
 Đức Chính
 Kim Sơn
 Tràng An
 Hồng Phong
 Yên Thọ
 Hoàng Quế

and 11 rural communes of:
 Thủy An
 Nguyễn Huệ
 Việt Dân
 Tân Việt
 Bình Dương
 Yên Đức
 Tràng Lương
 Bình Khê
 Hồng Thái Đông
 Hồng Thái Tây
 An Sinh

References

Districts of Quảng Ninh province
County-level towns in Vietnam